Florida Special is a 1936 American comedy film directed by Ralph Murphy and written by David Boehm, Marguerite Roberts, Laura Perelman and S. J. Perelman. The film stars Jack Oakie, Sally Eilers, Kent Taylor, Frances Drake, Claude Gillingwater and Sam Hearn. The film was released on April 21, 1936, by Paramount Pictures.

Plot

Newspaper reporter Bangs Carter and his rich buddy Wally Tucker end up on the Florida Special train bound for Florida with jewel thieves and Wally's ex-girlfriend. Bangs falls for a passenger, Jerry Quinn, along the way as they try to catch the crooks.

Cast 
Jack Oakie as Bangs Carter
Sally Eilers as Jerry Quinn
Kent Taylor as Wally Tucker
Frances Drake as Marina Landon
Claude Gillingwater as Simeon Stafford
Sam Hearn as Schlepperman
J. Farrell MacDonald as Captain Timothy Harrigan
Sidney Blackmer as Jack Macklyn
Matthew Betz as Herman Weil
Dwight Frye as Jenkins
Garry Owen as Joe
Clyde Dilson as Dominic
Mack Gray as Louie
Stanley Andrews as Armstrong

References

External links 
 

1936 films
1936 comedy films
American black-and-white films
American comedy films
Films directed by Ralph Murphy
Films set on trains
Paramount Pictures films
1930s English-language films
1930s American films